Mordellistena testacea is a species of beetle in the genus Mordellistena of the family Mordellidae. It was described by Blatchley in 1910.

References

External links
Coleoptera. BugGuide.

Beetles described in 1910
testacea